Tengellidae is a former family of spiders that has been merged into the family Zoropsidae. Genera formerly placed in Tengellidae now in Zoropsidae include:

Anachemmis Chamberlin, 1919 
Austrotengella Raven, 2012
Ciniflella Mello-Leitão, 1921
Lauricius Simon, 1888
Liocranoides Keyserling, 1881
Socalchemmis Platnick & Ubick, 2001
Tengella Dahl, 1901
Titiotus Simon, 1897
Wiltona Koçak & Kemal, 2008

See also
 Spider families

References

 

Historically recognized spider taxa